Olfert Viggo Fischer Kampmann (21 July 1910 – 3 June 1976) was a Danish politician who served as the leader of the Danish Social Democrats and Prime Minister of Denmark from 1960 to 1962. He formed his first cabinet just prior to the 1960 election, which was a coalition between the Social Democrats, the Justice Party and Social Liberal Party. Following the election, he formed another cabinet with the latter of the two parties. 

Before becoming Prime Minister he served as Finance Minister from 1953 to 1960 under Hans Hedtoft and H. C. Hansen.

Kampmann was born in Frederiksberg Denmark. He came from an academic background and was the first academic to rise to a high rank in the Danish Social Democratic Party. He studied economics at the University of Copenhagen, gaining a cand.polit. degree in 1934. Before becoming Minister of Finance, Kampmann worked in the newly formed economical secretariat as the Finance Minister's closest adviser. He was first elected to the Folketing in 1953.

Political career 
When Prime Minister and Social Democrat H. C. Hansen died in February 1960 Kampmann succeeded him, creating the Cabinet of Viggo Kampmann I. H. C. Hansen had cooperated with the Danish Social Liberal Party and the Justice Party, but Kampmann had problems working with the Justice Party. After the 1960 Danish parliamentary election, the Justice Party failed to get into Folketinget and the Danish Social Liberal Party went from 14 to 11 mandates. But the Social Democrats gained 6 mandates to 76, and Kampmann was able to form a minority government with the Social Liberal Party.

A number of progressive reforms were introduced during Kampmann's time as Prime Minister. The Rehabilitation Act of March 1960 established a unified framework providing rehabilitation, aids, vocational training, and special training centres for partially disabled and handicapped persons. Under the New Public Assistance Act of May 1961 (which replaced the 1933 Act) public assistance no longer resulted in the loss of political rights and restrictions on marriage. In 1961, health insurance was made compulsory.

In 1962 the oms, the precursor to the moms, was introduced.

Kampmann was one of the most intelligent and knowledgeable Danish Prime Ministers, though his conduct in office was erratic. Through most of his adult life he suffered from bipolar disorder, and in his darker moments he tended towards alcoholism and frequently 'disappeared' from view for days at a time, leaving the government without its head. The press of the day, more discreet than their contemporary peers, never publicised any of this.

Kampmann resigned on 3 September 1962 after a series of heart attacks, and was succeeded by Jens Otto Krag as leader of the Social Democrats and as Prime Minister. In retirement he worked as a political commentator and head of the Press Complaints Commission. Kampmann died in Store Torøje on 3 June 1976.

References

 Kristian Hvidt, Statsministre i Danmark fra 1913 til 1995 (1995)
 Growth to Limits: The Western European Welfare States Since World War II, Volume 4 edited by Peter Flora
 https://books.google.co.uk/books?id=jI0b97hNv1oC&pg=PA7&dq=denmark+health+insurance+1960&hl=en&sa=X&ei=9BJiVbiWFIOQ7Aay44KICA&ved=0CEMQ6AEwAw#v=onepage&q=denmark%20health%20insurance%201960&f=false
 Danish Wikipedia on Viggo Kampmann

1910 births
1976 deaths
People from Frederiksberg
Danish Finance Ministers
Prime Ministers of Denmark
Members of the Folketing
Burials at Vestre Cemetery, Copenhagen
20th-century Danish politicians
Leaders of the Social Democrats (Denmark)